Credit Abuse Resistance Education (CARE) is a national program founded by the U.S. Bankruptcy Court, WDNY and the Bankruptcy Committee of the Monroe County Bar Association. It was founded in 2002 by U.S. Bankruptcy Court, Chief Judge John C. Ninfo, II (retired).

CARE is a free financial literacy initiative that makes experienced members of the Bankruptcy Community available to teach the importance of financial education. These presentations are available to educational establishments. CARE's primary target is high school seniors and college freshmen who are most at risk because they are aggressively marketed by the credit card industry at a time when they carry a very low Financial I.Q.

CARE has a presence in all 50 states and the District of Columbia.

CARE Advisory Board
 Judge John C. Ninfo, II; U.S. Bankruptcy Court, Western District of New York - retired
 Paul Groschadl; Woods Oviatt Gilman, LLP
 Joe Schorer; Kirkland & Ellis LLP
 Allen Guon; Shaw Gussis Fishman Glantz Wolfson & Towbin LLC

CARE Judicial Advisory Board
 David D. Bird; Clerk, U.S. Bankruptcy Court, District of Delaware
 Brad Bolton; Clerk, U.S. Bankruptcy Court, District of Colorado
 Judge Sidney B. Brooks;U.S. Bankruptcy Court, District of Colorado
 Judge Carla E. Craig ; U.S. Bankruptcy Court, Eastern District of New York
 Judge Dennis R. Dow ; U.S. Bankruptcy Court, Western District of Missouri
 Judge A. Benjamin Goldgar; U.S. Bankruptcy Court, Northern District of Illinois, Eastern Division
 Judge Jeffery P. Hopkins; U.S. Bankruptcy Court, Southern District of Ohio
 Judge Laurel Myerson Isicoff; U.S. Bankruptcy Court, Southern District of Florida
 Judge Margaret M. Mann; U.S. Bankruptcy Court, Southern District of California
 Judge Catherine Peek McEwen; U.S. Bankruptcy Court, Middle District of Florida
 Judge C. Ray Mullins; U.S. Bankruptcy Court, Northern District of Georgia
 Judge Pamela Pepper; U.S. Bankruptcy Court, Eastern District of Wisconsin
 Judge Barry Russell; U.S. Bankruptcy Court, Central District of California
 Judge Paul R. Warren; U.S. Bankruptcy Court, Western District of New York

References

External links
 CARE Web site
 Washington Post article about CARE
 Rochester Democrat and Chronicle article about CARE
 Bankrate.com CARE article

United States bankruptcy law
Personal finance education